Anastasija Zolotic (born 23 November 2002) is an American taekwondo athlete and Olympic gold medalist. She won the silver medal at the 2018 Summer Youth Olympics in the girls 49 kg weight class. She qualified to represent the United States at the 2020 Summer Olympics. On Sunday 25 July 2021, at just 18-years-old, she became the first American woman to win Olympic gold in taekwondo, defeating Tatiana Minina of Russia 25 to 17. Her parents are immigrants from Bosnia and Herzegovina. She competed in the women's featherweight event at the 2022 World Taekwondo Championships held in Guadalajara, Mexico.

Medal record

Olympic Games

References

2002 births
Living people
American people of Bosnia and Herzegovina descent
American people of Serbian descent
American female taekwondo practitioners
Taekwondo practitioners at the 2018 Summer Youth Olympics
Sportspeople from Florida
Taekwondo practitioners at the 2019 Pan American Games
Pan American Games gold medalists for the United States
Pan American Games medalists in taekwondo
Medalists at the 2019 Pan American Games
People from Largo, Florida
Taekwondo practitioners at the 2020 Summer Olympics
Olympic gold medalists for the United States in taekwondo
Medalists at the 2020 Summer Olympics
Olympic taekwondo practitioners of the United States
Olympic medalists in taekwondo
21st-century American women